Stylaria may refer to:
 Stylaria (annelid), a genus of worms in the family Naididae
 Stylaria (alga), a genus of algae in the class Bacillariophyceae